Edburton Castle Ring (or Castle Rings) is an archaeological site in West Sussex, England, on the peak of Edburton Hill on the South Downs, near the villages of Edburton and Fulking. It is a Scheduled Monument.

Description
It is a motte-and-bailey castle, thought to have been built soon after the arrival of the Normans in 1066.

The castle survives as earthworks. There is a depression in the centre of the motte where there was 19th-century excavation, the monument being mistaken for a barrow.

References

Motte-and-bailey castles
Scheduled monuments in West Sussex